Bobadilla railway station (known in Spanish as estación de Bobadilla), is a southern Spanish railway station located west of the village of Bobadilla, Malaga Province.

History
The Algeciras-Bobadilla railway line was built to Algeciras from Bobadilla by the Algeciras Gibraltar Railway Company in 1891 which connects to this station.

On 30 March 1950, a mail train from Madrid to Málaga derailed on a set of points in Bobadilla station, killing 8 people and injuring 30.

References 

Railway stations in Andalusia
Derailments in Spain
Buildings and structures in Antequera
Railway stations in Spain opened in 1865